Låvebrua Island is an island,  high, lying  east of South Point, Deception Island, in the South Shetland Islands off Antarctica. It was charted by a British expedition under Henry Foster, 1828–31. The name was given by Norwegian whalers operating from Deception Island, and was in use as early as 1927; it is descriptive, meaning literally "threshing floor bridge" or "barn bridge", and was a slang word for the inclined plane of the whaling factories' slipway.

See also 
 List of antarctic and sub-antarctic islands

References

Islands of the South Shetland Islands
Geography of Deception Island